Kalnapilis is a Lithuanian brewery, established by Albert Foight in Panevėžys in 1902. A landowner of German origin, Foight  named the brewery Bergschlösschen, meaning a small castle on the hill. In 1918, the name was changed to a Lithuanian equivalent of Bergschlösschen, Kalnapilis.

Kalnapilis was taken over by Baltic Beverages Holding (established by Pripps of Sweden and Hartwall of Finland) in 1994. Ownership passed to Royal Unibrew in 2001, which merged the Kalnapilis with Tauras brewery in Vilnius into AB Kalnapilio-Tauro Grupė.

In April 1996, new fermentation and storage equipment enabled significantly different processing, the result being the introduction of three new brands. The brewery has an annual maximum capacity of 600,000 hectolitres.

Kalnapilis won two gold awards at the 2004 World Beer Cup, the Olympics of beer competitions; one in the German Style Heller Bock or Maibock category, for 'Kalnapilis 7.3', and one in the Muenchener style Helles category, for 'Kalnapilis Original'.

In 2007, "Kalnapilis" introduced a new type of beer "3 malts". In 2007, "Kalnapilis" became the major sponsor of the basketball club "Žalgiris", but already in 2008, after reducing the support, it lost this name.

The brand has a significant presence in sports advertising, and promotes a sporty image.

References

Beer in Lithuania
Food and drink companies established in 1902
1902 establishments in Lithuania
1902 establishments in the Russian Empire
Companies based in Panevėžys
Royal Unibrew subsidiaries